The Clouds of Northland Thunder is the second full-length studio album by Finnish symphonic power metal band Amberian Dawn. It was released 13 May 2009. Its single, "He Sleeps in a Grove", was the third Amberian Dawn song to have a music video produced.

A bonus track on Amberian Dawn's third album End of Eden shares its title with the album.

"He Sleeps in a Grove", "Incubus", "Kokko – Eagle of Fire","Willow of Tears", "Shallow Waters", "Snowmaiden", "Saga", "Lionheart", "Lost Soul", "Sons of Seven Stars", and "Morning Star" are featured as downloadable songs on the Rock Band Network.

Track listing

Personnel 
Amberian Dawn
 Heidi Parviainen – vocals, lyrics
 Tuomas Seppälä – guitar, keyboards, orchestral arrangements, producer
 Kasperi Heikkinen – guitar
 Emil Pohjalainen - guitar
 Tom Joens (as Tommi Kuri) bass guitar, producer
 Joonas Pykälä-aho – drums

Guest/session musicians
 Peter James Goodman – additional vocals on "Incubus"

Production
Lari Takala – engineer
Tero-Pekka Virtanen – mixing
Svante Forsbäck – mastering

References

External links 
 
 The Clouds of Northland Thunder at Encyclopaedia Metallum

Amberian Dawn albums
2009 albums